Toole's Theatre, was a 19th-century West End building in William IV Street, near Charing Cross, in the City of Westminster. A succession of auditoria had occupied the site since 1832, serving a variety of functions, including religious and leisure activities. The theatre at its largest, after reconstruction in 1881–82, had a capacity of between 650 and 700.

As the Charing Cross Theatre (1869–1876) the house became known for bills offering a mixture of drama, burlesque and operetta. Among the authors of its burlesques were W. S. Gilbert and H. B. Farnie. Its stars included Lydia Thompson, Lionel Brough and Willie Edouin. In 1876 Thompson and her husband, Alexander Henderson, became lessees of the theatre and renamed it the Folly Theatre. They continued the theatre's customary mix of operetta and burlesque. Their greatest successes were with English adaptations of French opéras bouffes and opéras comiques, most conspicuously Les cloches de Corneville, which began its record-breaking run (705 performances) at the Folly in 1878.

In 1879 the comic actor J. L. Toole took over the lease. In 1881 he changed the name to Toole's Theatre and had the building substantially reconstructed. He continued the policy of staging burlesques, but introduced more non-musical comedies and farces. Among the authors who wrote for the theatre were John Maddison Morton, F. C. Burnand and Henry Pottinger Stephens; composers included George Grossmith and Edward Solomon. The theatre was important for beginning the professional careers of many actors, writers and actor-managers. Among the playwrights whose early works were presented at Toole's were Arthur Wing Pinero and J. M. Barrie. Future stars who were members of the company as beginners included Kate Cutler, Florence Farr, Seymour Hicks, Irene and  Violet Vanbrugh and Lewis Waller.

The lease of the theatre expired in 1895, and the lessor, the Charing Cross Hospital, did not renew it. The theatre was demolished in 1896.

History

Early years

The building opened as the Lowther Rooms in 1833 following the redevelopment of the area by the Commissioners of Woods and Forests under Lord Lowther. Its early attractions included an exhibition by Madame Tussaud in 1834, patronised by royalty, but the venue rapidly acquired a certain notoriety: a later commentator wrote that it became "a favourite place of resort with the young men of the period, who were attracted thither by a dismal form of entertainment known as 'Blake's Masquerades'". After Blake departed, the building was used for religious purposes, first as the Roman Catholic Oratory of Saint Philip Neri from 1848 to 1852, and then as a Protestant institute and working men's club under the presidency of Lord Shaftesbury.

The premises were acquired by the entertainer William S. Woodin, who converted them, reopening as the Polygraphic Hall on 12 May 1855. Woodin gave one-man comic shows, beginning with The Olio of Oddities. He remained in possession of the hall for more than ten years, giving performances there between his provincial tours. When he was not in residence the hall was used for other one-man shows, lectures, amateur dramatic productions, and minstrel shows.

The building was sold to a partnership, E. W. Bradwell and W. R. Field, who acquired the adjoining houses and reconstructed the premises as a small playhouse called the Charing Cross Theatre. The Times reported that they converted the building "into a regular playhouse, of light and elegant appearance, with two tiers of boxes, abundant stalls, a limited pit and no gallery – altogether an edifice satisfactorily answering to the favourite word 'bijou', and well worth seeing". Its capacity was 600. The theatre opened on 19 June 1869 with a triple bill consisting of an operetta, a three-act drama and a  burlesque, the last being W. S. Gilbert's The Pretty Druidess, a parody of Bellini's opera Norma.

In 1872 an American manager, John S. Clarke, became proprietor. Under his management the theatre was variously advertised as the Charing Cross Theatre and the Theatre Royal, Charing Cross. He renovated the interior, receiving praise from The Sunday Times:

Among Clarke's productions was a revival of Sheridan's The Rivals, featuring Mrs Stirling as Mrs Malaprop and Clarke as Bob Acres; it ran for more than 50 performances, an unheard-of run at the time for an old classic.

In 1874 Lydia Thompson starred in H. B. Farnie's burlesque Blue Beard, in which she had played in the US nearly 500 times; her co-stars were Lionel Brough and Willie Edouin. The following year the theatre featured Kate Santley in a series of comic operas, and later Virginie Déjazet in a French season. John Hollingshead then presented burlesque, and in 1876 Thompson and her husband, Alexander Henderson (1828–1886) returned from a "farewell tour" of the US and became proprietors of the theatre.

Folly Theatre, 1876–1881

Henderson renamed the house the Folly Theatre. He said he meant to "shoot folly as it flies", and make the establishment the home of fun. The premises were reconstructed and elaborately decorated under the supervision of Thomas Verity. In his Dickens's Dictionary of London (1879), Charles Dickens Jr. described the Folly as "A little bandbox of a place, very prettily fitted up, and with a decided specialty for burlesque and opera bouffe". It reopened on 16 October 1876, with a revival of Blue Beard. At Christmas that year another Farnie burlesque was presented: Robinson Crusoe; it did well at the box-office, and Henderson continued to present opéra bouffe and burlesque. A triple bill of operettas by Hervé (Up the River), Lecocq (The Sea Nymphs) and Offenbach (The Creole) in 1877 featured Violet Cameron and Nelly Bromley, and was well received. In 1878 the theatre had a tremendous success with Robert Planquette's Les cloches de Corneville, adapted by Farnie and Robert Reece, which (after transferring to the Globe Theatre and returning to the Folly) ran for 705 performances, setting a record that stood for nearly a decade.

Thompson returned in Farnie and Reece's Stars and Garters in 1878, and continued with a series of burlesques including Tantalus; or, There's Many a Slip Twixt Cup and Lip and Carmen; or, Sold for a Song, until March 1879, when she and Henderson relinquished the management of the theatre. It was then taken by the singer-manager Selina Dolaro; Offenbach's La Périchole was the highlight of her season.

On 7 November 1879, the comic actor J. L. Toole took over the lease of the theatre. He opened with a triple bill of comedies: an early 19th-century "comedietta" called The Married Bachelor, H. J. Byron's three-act A Fool and His Money, and Ici on parle français, described by The Era as "the most successful farce of modern times", in which Toole played one of his most popular characters, Spriggins. This was a financial success, and Toole followed it with Byron's comedy The Upper Crust, which remained in his repertoire for the rest of his career. After presenting a revival of Dion Boucicault's Dickens adaption, Dot, based on The Cricket on the Hearth, and Hester's Mystery, an early play by Arthur Wing Pinero, as well as what the theatre historians Mander and Mitchenson describe as  "some now forgotten pieces", Toole went on tour. In his absence R. C. Carton presented a summer season in 1881 that included Imprudence, Pinero's first three-act comedy. When the season ended, Toole closed the theatre for substantial rebuilding; in December, while work was in progress, he announced a new name for the house: the Folly became Toole's Theatre, the first in London to follow the common American practice of calling a theatre after its actor-manager or owner.

Toole's Theatre, 1881–1896

Toole said that the rebuilding had cost him more than £10,000. The capacity of the house was much enlarged: Toole's held between 650 and 700 people. The Morning Post observed that the building had "undergone so complete a process of renovation and embellishment that it may now be regarded as one of the handsomest theatres in the metropolis". The Era praised the "spacious vestibule, the elegant foyer, the beautifully decorated staircases, the broad exits and entrances and the convenient verandah". The paper also commented on the "startling metamorphosis" of the auditorium: "The consciousness that we were in an adapted lecture-room or Roman Catholic chapel has departed for ever, and we now behold a most commodious little theatre". Toole did not emulate Richard D'Oyly Carte at the new Savoy Theatre by installing electric light: the stage and front of house at Toole's remained gas-lit.

Toole had intended to open his reconstructed theatre with a new comedy by Byron, but the playwright's health prevented him from completing the work, and Toole opened, on 16 February 1882, with a triple bill of two revivals – Paul Pry, one of the greatest successes in his repertoire, and Mark Lemon's farce, Domestic Economy – and a new "comedietta", "Waiting Consent", by May Holt.

Toole's staples were burlesque, light opera and comedies, including farces. Burlesques included Stage Dora; or, Who Killed Cock Robin, F. C. Burnand's parody of Sardou's Fédora (1883) and Paw Claudian (1884) Burnand's lampoon of a recent costume drama Claudian by Henry Herman and W. G. Wills. Comic operas included Mr. Guffin's Elopement and The Great Tay-Kin, both by Arthur Law and George Grossmith (1885), Billee Taylor by Henry Pottinger Stephens and Edward Solomon (1886), and Lecocq's Pepita (1888, from his original La princesse des Canaries).

There were new comedies as well as old favourites. Among them were Pinero's Girls and Boys (1882), John Maddison Morton's final play, a three-act farcical comedy called Going It (1885), Herman Charles Merivale's The Butler (1886) and The Don (1888), and Fred Horner's The Bungalow (1890), an English version of Eugène Medina's La Garçonnière. Ibsen's Ghost (1891), a one-act lampoon of Henrik Ibsen's plays and disciples, starring Irene Vanbrugh and Toole, was J. M. Barrie's first London play. In 1892 Toole directed the premiere of Barrie's Walker, London, which ran for 497 performances. In Toole's absence on tour other managements took temporary charge at his theatre, including William Terriss, Willie Edouin Augustin Daly with his New York company in 1884, and Violet Melnotte in 1890.

Toole retained a stock company, and many newcomers had their first opportunities at Toole's under his management, including Mary Brough, Kate Cutler, Florence Farr, Seymour Hicks, Eva Moore, Irene Vanbrugh, Violet Vanbrugh and Lewis Waller.

In 1895 the expiry of Toole's lease was approaching, and his health was in decline. His last piece was Thoroughbred by Ralph Lumley, which opened on 13 February. Within a week, Toole had to withdraw. His role was temporarily taken by Rutland Barrington until Toole recovered sufficiently to finish the run in September. The last night under his management was on 28 September; Toole made his farewell to London audiences, and after touring until the following year he retired. Two weeks after the closure, The Era reported:

No potential tenant willing to make the required outlay came forward, and a proposed plan for a redevelopment by the architect C. J. Phipps came to nothing. The theatre's performance licence was withdrawn, and in the spring of 1896 the building was demolished. The hospital, which had for some time been expressing concern about the noise and the risk of fire from a theatre so close, used the site to build a new out-patients' department.

Gallery

Notes, references and sources

Notes

References

Sources

 
 
 

 
 
 

1895 disestablishments in England
19th century in London
Charles J. Phipps buildings
Former buildings and structures in the City of Westminster
Former music hall venues in the United Kingdom
Former theatres in London
Theatres completed in 1840